Government Senior Secondary School Dhudi or GSSS Dhudi is one of the senior secondary schools of Faridkot district in Punjab, India. Established in 1954, it covers grades 6–12. It has all streams of study for +1 and +2 class students.

References

High schools and secondary schools in Punjab, India
Government schools in India